Psilalcis is a genus of moths in the family Geometridae.

Selected species

Psilalcis albibasis (Hampson, 1895)
Psilalcis breta (Wileman, 1911)
Psilalcis diorthogonia (Wehrli, 1925)
Psilalcis fui Sato, 2002
Psilalcis menoides (Wehrli, 1943)
Psilalcis nigrifasciata (Wileman, 1912)
Psilalcis pulveraria (Wileman, 1912)
Psilalcis rotundata Inoue, 1998

References
Natural History Museum Lepidoptera genus database

Boarmiini